Delano & Aldrich was an American Beaux-Arts architectural firm based in New York City. Many of its clients were among the wealthiest and most powerful families in the state. Founded in 1903, the firm operated as a partnership until 1935, when Aldrich left for an appointment in Rome. Delano continued in his practice nearly until his death in 1960.

History
The firm was founded in 1903 by William Adams Delano and Chester Holmes Aldrich, who met when they worked together at the office of Carrère and Hastings in the years before the turn of the 20th century.

Almost immediately after the firm was formed, they won commissions from the Rockefeller family, among others.  Delano & Aldrich tended to adapt conservative Georgian and Federal architectural styles for their townhouses, churches, schools, and a spate of social clubs for the Astors, Vanderbilts, and the Whitneys.  Separately (Delano was the more prolific) and in tandem, they designed a number of buildings at Yale.

Their work was part of the architecture event in the art competition at the 1928 Summer Olympics.

Aldrich left the partnership in 1935 to become the resident director of the American Academy at Rome, where he died in 1940. Delano continued to practice almost until his death in 1960.

Notable works

Surviving buildings (all in New York City unless noted):
 Hathaway, Tannersville, New York, 1907.
 High Lawn, (Lenox, Massachusetts), a wedding gift for William B. Osgood Field and his wife, Lila Sloane Field, 1908; one of the "Berkshire Cottages", with bas-reliefs by the bride's cousin Gertrude Vanderbilt Whitney.
 Barbey Building, 15 West 38th Street, 1909.
 Walters Art Museum, Baltimore, 1910. Their first major public commission.
 (Center for Inter-American Relations), 1911. Neo-Federal townhouse, part of a harmonious row continuing a theme set by McKim, Mead, and White next door, in the first flush of buildings along Park Avenue, formed by covering over New York Central tracks in the area. 
 Wright Memorial Hall (now Lanman-Wright Hall), Old Campus, Yale University, New Haven, CT, 1912.  Brownstone Collegiate Gothic.
 Kykuit, the principal Classical Revival mansion in the Rockefeller family estate, Sleepy Hollow, New York, 1913.
 Willard D. Straight House, 5th Avenue, 1914. Later used as the headquarters of the National Audubon Society and the International Center for Photography. An English brick block, in the manner of Sir Christopher Wren at Hampton Court, was Americanized with black shutters.
 Belair Mansion, major renovation, in Bowie, Maryland, 1914.
 St. Bernard's School, 98th Street, 1915.
  Knickerbocker Club, 62nd and Fifth Avenue, 1915. A discreet Federal townhouse on Fifth Avenue.

 Colony Club, 62nd and Park Avenue, 1916.
 Woodside (demolished), (Syosset, New York), for James A. Burden and his wife, Florence, 1916. The architects worked the spirit of Annapolis's Whitehall, a 1760 plantation house, into the design.
 Greenwich House, 1917. The community later added two floors to this center, stretching the Georgian townhouse manner to the limit.
 Francis F. Palmer House (later George F. Baker, Jr. House), 75 East 93rd Street at Park Avenue, 1918 (altered with a ballroom wing added in 1928).
 Cutting Houses, 12 to 16 East 89th Street, 1919.
 Cushing Memorial Gallery, Newport, Rhode Island, 1919.
 Oheka, Huntington, New York, 1919.
 Harold Pratt House, 68th and Park, 1920, built for Harold I. Pratt; it is now headquarters of the Council on Foreign Relations.
 Interiors of the Grand Central Art Galleries, New York, 1922.
 Chelsea, the Benjamin Moore Estate, Muttontown, New York, 1923.
 Sterling Chemistry Lab, Science Hill, Yale University, New Haven, CT, 1923.
 Third Church of Christ, Scientist; Park Avenue at 63rd Street, 1924.
 1040 Park Avenue, at 86th, apartment building, 1924. In low relief along a classical frieze, tortoises alternate with hares. Condé Nast took the penthouse.
 Sage-Bowers Hall, Yale School of Forestry, New Haven, CT, 1924 (Sage), 1931 (Bowers). Two buildings in brownstone Collegiate Gothic style.
 Willard Straight Hall, Cornell University, Ithaca, NY, 1925. Collegiate Gothic.
 The Brook, 111 East 54th Street, 1925
 Fathers Building, The Lawrenceville School, Lawrenceville, NJ, dedicated September 1925.
 William L. Harkness Hall, Yale University, New Haven, CT, 1927. Collegiate Gothic.
 Chapin School, at 84th and East End Avenue, 1928. Neo-Georgian
 McPherson House, The Lawrenceville School, Lawrenceville, NJ, 1929
 63 Wall Street, 1929. Vertical bands of windows alternate with ashlar limestone cladding in setbacks to a penthouse with Art Deco gargoyles.
 Alpha Chi Rho, now part of the Yale School of Drama, New Haven, CT, 1930.
 The U.S. Pavilion at the Venice Biennale, 1930. Designed with Chester Holmes Aldrich, the building was constructed of Istrian marble and pink brick.
 "Peterloon," Indian Hill, Ohio, for John J. Emery, 1931
 Embassy of Japan in Washington, D.C., 1931
 American Embassy, Paris, 1931
 Frank Porter Wood home, Toronto, 1931.  Now Crescent School.
 Confederate Defenders of Charleston, Charleston, SC, 1932.
 U.S. Post Office, Glen Cove, New York, 1932
 Sterling Divinity Quadrangle, Yale Divinity School, New Haven, CT, 1932.  Georgian colonial group of buildings.
 Union Club, 69th and Park Avenue, 1933. A smoothly rusticated Italianate limestone palazzo in the manner of London clubs of the 19th century, "one of the last great monuments of the American Renaissance".
 Pan American Airways System Terminal Building (now Miami City Hall), Dinner Key in Miami, Florida, 1933
 Boxwood Lodge, near Mocksville, North Carolina, 1933-1934
 New Post Office Department, Washington, D.C., 1934
 Ferry Building, U.S. Immigration Station, Ellis Island, New York Harbor, 1935-1936

Archives
The Delano and Aldrich archive is held by the Drawings and Archives Department in the Avery Architectural and Fine Arts Library at Columbia University. Some historical records of Delano & Aldrich's work on the Wall Street headquarters of Brown Brothers Harriman are included in the Brown Brothers Harriman Collection housed in the manuscript collections at New-York Historical Society.

References

External links
 Delano & Aldrich architectural records and papers, circa 1900-1949. Held by the Department of Drawings & Archives, Avery Architectural & Fine Arts Library, Columbia University.
 Delano & Aldrich's Historic Long Island Commissions
 Peter Pennoyer and Anne Walker, 2003. The Architecture of Delano & Aldrich (Norton)  Eighteen projects are examined in detail, and a catalogue of the firm's complete oeuvre. Introduction by Robert A.M. Stern
 Christopher Gray, "The Architecture of Delano & Aldrich; How an Upper-Class Firm Tweaked Classical Norms" in The New York Times, April 27, 2003
 ArtNet: Delano & Aldrich
 Brick & Cornice: Delano & Aldrich Buildings

 
Defunct architecture firms based in New York City
American neoclassical architects
Architects from New York City
20th-century American architects
Olympic competitors in art competitions